Isis Naija Gaston (born January1, 2000), known professionally as Ice Spice, is an American rapper. She grew up in the Bronx, New York City, and began her career in 2021 after meeting record producer RiotUSA while attending State University of New York at Purchase. She rose to prominence in late 2022 with her song "Munch (Feelin' U)". 

The release of her singles "Bikini Bottom" and "In Ha Mood", preceded her debut extended play Like..? (2023). In 2023, she achieved her first Billboard Hot 100 chart entry with the Lil Tjay collaboration "Gangsta Boo", and her remix single "Boy's a Liar Pt. 2" with PinkPantheress reached the top three.

Ice Spice was hailed by Jon Caramanica of The New York Times as "rap's new princess", and was named a "breakout star" by Time magazine.

Early life  
Isis Gaston was born on January 1, 2000, in the Bronx, New York City, where she was raised in the Fordham Road neighborhood. She is the oldest of five siblings. Her father, a former underground rapper, is African-American, while her mother, who gave birth to Gaston at age 17, is Dominican. The two first met at a McDonald's and divorced when Gaston was two years old. Because her parents were frequently busy working, she spent much of her time with her grandparents and cousins growing up. She went to school in the Bronx until she was sent to Sacred Heart High School, a Catholic high school in Yonkers. At age seven, she took a liking to hip hop after listening to rappers like  Lil' Kim, Nicki Minaj, and others and wrote poetry and freestyle raps from elementary school to high school. She would type out lyrics in the notes section of her iPhone, listening to hip-hop instrumentals and rapping out loud to them. "When I saw Nicki [Minaj], I was so mesmerized," Ice Spice explained. "She's the first female rapper that I seen. And ever since then, I was kinda set on what I wanted to be." She chose Ice Spice as her soubriquet while she was a freshman in high school.

Ice Spice attended State University of New York at Purchase, where she played back row on the school's volleyball team and studied communications. Ice Spice dropped out of SUNY Purchase around her sophomore year. "I left because I felt like I was in the wrong place." Ice Spice also attributed her "strenuous commute" for leaving college.

Ice Spice is the eldest sister to five siblings, and told The Cut she was their self-appointed protector. She supported herself as a cashier at Wendy's and The Gap.

Career
Ice Spice started rapping in 2021 after meeting with a record producer, RiotUSA, while they were attending State University of New York at Purchase. He produced her debut song, "Bully Freestyle", released in March 2021 after a video of Ice Spice doing the "Buss It" challenge went viral on Twitter. Her song "Name of Love" gained traction on SoundCloud, which led to her becoming popular on Instagram. Her song "Munch (Feelin' U)", released on August 10, 2022, with a video, and also produced by RiotUSA and distributed by WorldStarHipHop, gained popularity after getting support from Drake, who played the song on his Sirius XM radio station, Sound 42. It subsequently went viral on Twitter and TikTok, and charted on Billboards Hot R&B/Hip-Hop Songs and Bubbling Under Hot 100 charts. In September 2022, Ice Spice appeared as a featured artist on the song "One Time" by B-Lovee. Later that month, she signed a record deal with 10K Projects and Capitol Records. On October 28, she released the single "Bikini Bottom". Ice Spice's debut EP, Like..?, was released on January 20, 2023, and included the singles "Munch (Feelin' U)", "Bikini Bottom", and "In Ha Mood".

In February 2023, Ice Spice collaborated with Lil Tjay on the tribute single "Gangsta Boo" to the late rapper of the same name, which became her first song on the Billboard Hot 100 at No. 82. On February 3, 2023, the remix of singer PinkPantheress's song, "Boy's a Liar Pt. 2" featuring Ice Spice and the corresponding music video were released. The song peaked at No. 3 on the Billboard Hot 100, the highest charting position for either artist at the time.

Musical style 
Ice Spice's music is primarily Bronx drill. Her name came from a "finsta" (secret Instagram account) she made at age 14. She has said she writes all her own lyrics. She was first inspired to start rapping by Sheff G and Pop Smoke, and has listed Lil' Kim, Nicki Minaj, Cardi B, Foxy Brown, and Remy Ma as musical influences due to their New York roots. She has also called Erykah Badu and Lauryn Hill inspirations because of their "graceful angelic vibe of timeless beauty".

Discography

Extended plays

Singles

Other charted songs

Music videos

Notes

References

External links 
 

2000 births
Living people
21st-century American rappers
21st-century African-American musicians
21st-century LGBT people
21st-century women rappers
African-American women rappers
American LGBT songwriters
American rappers of Dominican Republic descent
Drill musicians
East Coast hip hop musicians
Hispanic and Latino American rappers
LGBT people from New York (state)
LGBT rappers
Pansexual musicians
Queer songwriters
Rappers from the Bronx
State University of New York at Purchase alumni